North Carolina Highway 62 (NC 62) is a primary state highway in the U.S. state of North Carolina.  Primarily in the Piedmont Triad, it runs from NC 109 in Thomasville northeast to the Virginia state line in Milton.

Route description

East of Archdale, it overlaps with NC Bike Route 2 through the communities of Climax and Julian. Before the town of Alamance, the highway goes right through the middle of the Alamance Battleground (the area will be marked with several colored flags and monuments). After crossing I-40/I-85, NC 62 does a zig-zag through downtown Burlington. Continuing north of town, it goes through the communities and towns of Pleasant Grove, Jericho, and Yanceyville, before reaching the town of Milton. After crossing the Dan River, it enters the Commonwealth of Virginia; where it continues for  before ending on US 58/US 360, east of Danville, Virginia.

History
NC 62 was an original state highway; starting from Asheboro (then NC 70, currently US 221 Business), going northeast through Liberty and Graham, and ending in Yanceyville (then NC 14, currently Main Street).  In 1928, the route was extended from Asheboro to New London, and again in 1930 from Yanceyville to Milton.  In 1933, the route was moved north of New London and extended to Mount Pleasant.

In 1940, NC 62 was realigned to a new routing south of Pleasant Grove to its now current routing through Burlington and Archdale, ending in Thomasville at NC 109.  The former route to Mount Pleasant is now part of NC 49.

In 1947, NC 62 was extended into Virginia, which also created VA 62.  The last change to the route was between 1954–57, between the community of Fitch to Yanceyville, moving to a new road east; leaving behind Oak View Loop Road and Badgett Sisters Parkway.

Major intersections

Special routes

Historically there was one  alternate route in New London, from 1935-1940; it was labeled as NC 62A.  It was soon renumbered as NC 49A when NC 49 replaced NC 62 in the area.  Later, in 1947, it would renumber again to NC 6, then finally in 1953 as an extension and terminus of NC 8.

See also
North Carolina Bicycle Route 2 - Concurrent with NC 62 from SR 1129 near Jamestown to Kimesville
North Carolina Bicycle Route 4 - Concurrent with NC 62 from Yanceyville to Hamer

References

External links

NCRoads.com: N.C. 62

062
Transportation in Davidson County, North Carolina
Transportation in Randolph County, North Carolina
Transportation in Guilford County, North Carolina
Transportation in Alamance County, North Carolina
Transportation in Caswell County, North Carolina